Federico Munerati (20 September 1901 – 26 July 1980) was an Italian footballer who played as a forward or as a midfielder.

Club career
Born in La Spezia, Italy, Munerati played most of his career with Italian club Juventus (1922–33), where he won four Italian league titles during his nine seasons with the Turin side. He remains 10th on the all-time top goalscorers list for the Old Lady, as he scored 113 goals in 256 appearances in all competitions during his time spent playing with the club. He later spent single-season spells with Sampierdarenese (1933–1934) and A.C. Pistoiese (1934–1935), before retiring.

International career
At international level, Munerati also played for the Italy national football team on four occasions in 1926 and 1927. He made his international debut on 18 July, under manager Augusto Rangone, in a 5–3 defeat to Sweden. He also made two appearances for the Italy B side, between 1926 and 1927.
His biggest achievement was playing the first 2 matches of Italy´s successful 1927–30 Central European International Cup campaign.

Managerial career
Munerati returned to Juventus after retirement from playing in the 1940s. He managed the club from 1940 until 1942.

Style of play
A versatile player, Munerati usually played as an offensive-minded winger on the right, due to his pace, athleticism, technical ability, crossing accuracy, and ability to both score and create goals. Has also capable of playing as a striker or centre-forward, due to his eye for goal, opportunism in the penalty area, ability to make attacking runs, and his accuracy with his head. He was also deployed as an offensive minded central midfielder on occasion.

Honours
Juventus
Serie A: 1925–26, 1930–31, 1931–32, 1932–33

Sampierdarenese
Serie B: 1933–34

International 
Italy
 Central European International Cup: 1927-30

References

External links

Italian footballers
Italy international footballers
Juventus F.C. players
1901 births
1980 deaths
Italian football managers
Juventus F.C. managers
Serie A players
Serie A managers
U.S. Pistoiese 1921 players
Sportspeople from the Province of La Spezia
Association football forwards
Association football midfielders
Footballers from Liguria